Process flowsheeting is the use of computer aids to perform steady-state heat and mass balancing, sizing and costing calculations for a chemical process. It is an essential and core component of process design.

The process design effort may be split into three basic steps
 Synthesis
 Analysis and
 Optimization.

Synthesis 

Synthesis is the step where the structure of the flowsheet is chosen. It is also in this step that one initializes values for variables which one is free to set.

Analysis 

Analysis is usually made up of three steps
 Solving heat and  material balances
 Sizing and costing the equipment and
 Evaluating the economic worth, safety, operability etc. of the chosen flow sheet

Optimization 

Optimization involves both structural optimization of the flow sheet itself as well as optimization of parameters in a given flowsheet. In the former one may alter the equipment used and/or its connections with other equipment. In the latter one can change the values of parameters such as temperature and pressure. Parameter Optimization is a more advanced stage of theory than process flowsheet optimization.

Plant design project 

The first step in the sequence leading to the construction of a process plant and its use in the manufacture of a product is the conception of a process. The concept is embodied in the form of a "flow sheet". Process design then proceeds on the basis of the flow sheet chosen. Physical property data are the other component needed for process design apart from a flow sheet. The result of process design is a process flow diagram, PFD. Detailed engineering for the project and vessel specifications then begin. Process flowsheeting ends at the point of generation of a suitable PFD.

General purpose flowsheeting programs became usable and reliable around 1965-1970.

See also 
 List of chemical process simulators
 CAPE-OPEN Interface Standard
 Process simulation

References

 Westerberg A. W., Hutchinson H. P., Motard R. L., and Winter P., (1979), "Process Flowsheeting", Cambridge Universities Press, 
 Veverka V. V., and Madron, F. (1997), "Material and Energy balancing in the Process Industries", Elsevier, 
 Babu, B. V.(2004), "Process Plant Simulation", Oxford Universities Press, ISBN

External links
Process flowsheet development using process simulation software 
Chemical process engineering

Process engineering